Takasagovolva is a genus of sea snails, marine gastropod mollusks in the family Ovulidae.

Species
Species within the genus Takasagovolva include:
Takasagovolva gigantea Azuma, 1974
Takasagovolva honkakujiana (Kuroda, 1928)

References

Ovulidae